Matthäus Prätorius ((c.1635–c.1704) was a Protestant pastor, later a Roman Catholic priest, a historian and ethnographer.

Prätorius is thought to have been born in Memel (Klaipėda). He probably grew up speaking both German and Lithuanian, which helped him when preaching to the ethnic Lithuanians in Ducal Prussia. His work about Prussia and its culture, Deliciae Prussicae, oder Preussische Schaubühne, resembles the work of Christoph Hartknoch, with whom he collaborated. Prätorius' work provides much more ethnographic information regarding local Lithuanians and Old Prussians. It was only published partially, in 1725 (in Erleutertes Preußen), 1731 (in Acta Borussica) and 1871. A complete edition, in seven volumes, with original German text and Lithuanian translation, is under preparation in Lithuania.

In 1701, having converted from Protestantism to Roman Catholicism, he appealed against an ongoing case of witch-hunt.  He died in Wejherowo (Weyherststadt).

In Orbis Gothicus and Mars Gothicus sustained that Prussia was the original land of Goths and that Goths can be identified as being "prussians, lithuanians, samogitians and curonians [latvians]".

Works

Tuba pacis, 1685, 1711, 1820

Scutum Regium, 1685

Orbis Gothicus, 1688-1689

Mars Gothicus, 1691

Deliciae Prussicae oder Preussische Schaubühne, 1689 manuscript

Matas Pretorijus / / Matthew Praetorius. Prūsijos įdomybės, arba Prūsijos regykla / / Deliciae Prussicae or Prussian theater. Edited by Inge Lukšaité and Vilija Gerulaitienė. Vilnius: Pradai. Vol 1 (1999), Vol 2, ed. Ingė Lukšaitė in collaboration with V. Gerulaitienė, M. Čiurinskas, I. Tumavičiūtė, Vilnius: Lietuvos istorijos instituto Leidykla, (2004), Vol 3, hersg. Inge Lukšaité with the collaboration of M. Girdzijauskaitė, p Drevello, J. Kilius, Čiurinskas M., (2006) Vol 4, hersg. Inge Lukšaité in collaboration with V. Gerulaitienė, J. Kilius, T. Veteikis, Vilnius. Lietuvos istorijos instituto Leidykla, (2011)  (for all 7 vol).

See also 
 Jurate Rosales

References

Further reading

 Matthäus Prätorius' deliciae prussicae oder Preußische Schaubühne. Im wörtlichen Auszuge aus dem Manuscript herausgegeben von Dr. William Piersson [Matthäus Prätorius' deliciae prussicae or Prussian theater. In the literal excerpt from the manuscript edited by Dr. William Piersson]. A. Duncker's Buch-Verlag, Berlin, 1871, 152 pp.
 Franz Heinrich Reusch: Matthäus Prätorius. In: Allgemeine Deutsche Biographie. Sechsundzwanzigster Band. Auf Veranlassung Seiner Majestät des Königs von Bayern herausgegeben durch die historische Commission bei der Königl. Akademie der Wissenschaften. Verlag von Duncker & Humblot, Leipzig, 1888, p. 529 f. (Wikisource)
 Nijolė Strakauskaitė: Simon Dach und Martin Ludwig Rhesa im litauischen Kontext [Simon Dach and Martin Ludwig Rhesa in the Lithuanian context]. Annaberger Annalen, Heft 14. 2006 (annaberger-annalen.de (PDF))
 Ingė Lukšaitė, Vilija Gerulaitienė: Matas Pretorijus. Prūsijos įdomybės, arba Prūsijos regykla. Vilnius: Pradai. Bd. 1 (1999), Bd. 2 (2004). .
 Inge Lukšaitė, Matthew Praetorius - historian of Prussian culture. Life, Work and Scientific sheep, Matas Pretorijus / / Matthew Praetorius. Prūsijos įdomybės, arba Prūsijos regykla / / Deliciae Prussicae or Prussian theater. Edited by Inge Lukšaité and Vilija Gerulaitienė. Vilnius: Pradai. Vol 1 (1999), pp. 85–140; same, Matthew Praetorius and the second and third book of his work, Deliciae Prussicae ', op. 2, pp. 25–43.
 William Mannhardt Letto-Prussian Götterlehere, Riga, 1936, pp. 524–604;  Baltų religijos ir mitologijos šaltiniai / / Sources of Baltic religion and mythology, Bd . 3, hersg. of Norbertas Velius, Vilnius: The science and encyclopaedia publishing institutions, pp. 107–323.

Balticists
1635 births
1704 deaths
17th-century German historians
People from Klaipėda
People from the Duchy of Prussia
German Roman Catholics
Converts to Roman Catholicism from Lutheranism
German male non-fiction writers